Gaverina Terme is a comune (municipality) in the Province of Bergamo in the Italian region of Lombardy, located about  northeast of Milan and about  northeast of Bergamo.

Gaverina Terme borders the following municipalities: Albino, Bianzano, Casazza, Cene, Spinone al Lago.

References

Spa towns in Italy